Gordon G. Gallup Jr. (born 1941) is an American psychologist in the University at Albany's psychology department, researching biopsychology.

Early life and education
Gallup received his Ph.D. from Washington State University in 1968, after which he joined the faculty of the psychology department at Tulane University.

Career
He is best known for developing the mirror test, also called the mirror self-recognition test, or MSR, in 1970, which gauges self-awareness of animals. In 1975, Gallup moved to the University at Albany.

During his tenure at Tulane, Gallup also developed a research interest in tonic immobility, or "animal hypnosis," which he continued at the University at Albany. His later work on animal behavior focused on ethological approaches to the study of animal behavior under laboratory conditions, which he pursued with Susan Suarez in the 1980s.

Since the 1990s, Gallup has researched human evolutionary psychology exclusively. Gallup's article entitled "Does Semen Have Antidepressant Properties?" attracted the attention of the media when it was published in 2002. Gallup commented, "I want to make it clear that we are not advocating that people abstain from using condoms. Clearly, an unwanted pregnancy or a sexually transmitted disease would more than offset any advantageous psychological effects of semen."

Publications

References

External links
Faculty page

Animal cognition writers
21st-century American psychologists
Living people
University at Albany, SUNY faculty
Washington State University alumni
1941 births
Journal of Comparative Psychology editors
20th-century American psychologists